A civil danger warning (SAME code: CDW) is a warning issued through the Emergency Alert System (EAS) in the United States to warn the public of an event that presents a danger to a significant civilian population. It is typically issued by a local or state authority and is relayed by the National Weather Service. The warning usually mentions a specific hazard such as contaminated water supply, a major accident, or an imminent or in-progress military or terrorist attack. It may also provide instructions for protective action such as to evacuate, shelter-in-place, boil water or seek medical treatment. The warning has a higher priority than a local area emergency (LAE).

Examples

Hawaii false alarm 

On 13 January 2018, as part of the false missile alert, a civil danger warning interrupted local television and radio broadcasts throughout Hawaii, in addition to the warning sent to smartphones.

Other examples 
BULLETIN - IMMEDIATE BROADCAST REQUESTED
CIVIL DANGER WARNING
WISCONSIN EMERGENCY MANAGEMENT AGENCY MILWAUKEE/SULLIVAN
RELAYED BY NATIONAL WEATHER SERVICE MILWAUKEE/SULLIVAN WI
1233 AM CST WED FEB 2 2011

THE FOLLOWING MESSAGE IS TRANSMITTED AT THE REQUEST OF THE WISCONSIN
EMERGENCY MANAGEMENT AGENCY MILWAUKEE/SULLIVAN WISCONSIN. DRIVING IS
EXTREMELY HAZARDOUS TONIGHT ON ALL ROADS IN SOUTHERN WISCONSIN. IF YOU
BECOME STRANDED...EMERGENCY VEHICLES MAY NOT BE ABLE TO REACH YOU.
IF YOU ARE STRANDED...DO NOT LEAVE YOUR VEHICLE. RUN YOUR VEHICLE 10
MINUTES PER HOUR...AND CRACK A DOWN WIND WINDOW FOR VENTILATION.

$$

�
597 
WOUS44 KLZK 272046
CDWLZK
ARC083-280000-

URGENT - IMMEDIATE BROADCAST REQUESTED
CIVIL DANGER WARNING
ARKANSAS EMERGENCY MANAGEMENT AGENCY LITTLE ROCK ARKANSAS
RELAYED BY NATIONAL WEATHER SERVICE LITTLE ROCK AR
346 PM CDT MON MAY 27 2019

THE FOLLOWING MESSAGE IS TRANSMITTED AT THE REQUEST OF THE
LOGAN COUNTY EMERGENCY MANAGEMENT AGENCY AND THE LOGAN COUNTY 
JUDGE.

MCLEAN BOTTOMS IN LOGAN COUNTY IS CLOSED OFF TO ALL PUBLIC
ACCESS EFFECTIVE IMMEDIATELY. THIS INCLUDES PORTIONS OF NORTH
HIGHWAY 309, COTTONTOWN RD., AND KALAMAZOO ROAD. THIS IS BY 
ORDER OF THE LOGAN COUNTY JUDGE, NO PERSONS ARE ALLOWED IN
THIS AREA DUE TO FORECAST FLOODING. DRIVING INTO THIS AREA 
MAY PUT YOUR LIFE IN DANGER!

$$

CAVANAUGH 

000
WOUS43 KGID 110452
CDWGID
NEC001-110552-

BULLETIN - EAS ACTIVATION REQUESTED
CIVIL DANGER WARNING
NE ADAMS COUNTY EMERGENCY MANAGEMENT
RELAYED BY NATIONAL WEATHER SERVICE HASTINGS NE
1152 PM CDT TUE AUG 10 2021

...ACTIVE SHOOTER IN PROGRESS...

THE FOLLOWING MESSAGE IS TRANSMITTED AT THE REQUEST OF ADAMS
COUNTY EMERGENCY MANAGEMENT.

THERE IS AN ACTIVE SHOOTER CURRENTLY IN JUNIATA NE AROUND THE N.
BRASS AREA.  SHELTER IN PLACE IMMEDIATELY

SHELTER IN PLACE IMMEDIATELY AND LOCK ALL WINDOWS AND DOORS. THIS
IS FOR THE JUNIATA AREA AND 2 MILES EAST OF JUNIATA NEBRASKA

$$

AS-NE-872DB331-ABDF-4F99-84C5-4E69A19C1C46/ALERTSENSE

References

External links
 https://www.weather.gov/help-map
 https://www.weather.gov/lub/nonweathercemdescriptions

Emergency Alert System
National Weather Service
Warning systems